"Just Wanna Please U" is a song by American R&B artist Mona Lisa which was recorded for her debut album 11-20-79 (1996). The song was released as the album's third and final single in November 1996.

Track listings
12", Vinyl
"Just Wanna Please U" (Album Version) - 4:20
"Just Wanna Please U" (Stevie J. Version) - 4:07(feat. The LOX)
"Just Wanna Please U" (Stevie J. Version w/o Rap) - 4:07

12", Vinyl
"Just Wanna Please U" (Stevie J. version) - 4:07(feat. The LOX)
"Just Wanna Please U" (Stevie J. version w/o rap) - 4:07
"Just Wanna Please U" (Album version) - 4:20
"Just Wanna Please U" (Stevie J. A cappella version) - 4:07(feat. The LOX)

Personnel
Information taken from Discogs.
executive production – Hiriam Hicks, Tim "Dawg" Patterson
lyrics – The LOX, Mona Lisa, Kelly Price
production – Clark Kent
rapping – The LOX
remixing – Stevie J.

Chart performance

Notes

1996 singles
Mona Lisa (singer) songs
Songs written by Bobby Caldwell
1996 songs
Island Records singles